Gennady Dobrokhotov (born 24 September 1948) is a Soviet boxer. He competed in the men's lightweight event at the 1972 Summer Olympics.

References

1948 births
Living people
Soviet male boxers
Olympic boxers of the Soviet Union
Boxers at the 1972 Summer Olympics
Place of birth missing (living people)
Lightweight boxers
Moscow State Mining University alumni